Brian Joseph Johnson (born 29 October 1948) is an English footballer, who played as a midfielder in the Football League for Tranmere Rovers.

References

External links

Tranmere Rovers F.C. players
Northwich Victoria F.C. players
Association football midfielders
English Football League players
1948 births
Living people
English footballers